"Tout donner" is a song by Congolese-French singer and rapper Maître Gims released on 11 November 2016. It is the last song by Gims released on the Wati B label.

Charts

Weekly charts

Year-end charts

References

2016 songs
2016 singles
Gims songs
French-language songs
Songs written by Gims